Musée de la Lutherie et de l'Archèterie françaises is a museum in Mirecourt, Vosges, France. It is dedicated to the history of violin making.

See also
 List of music museums

External links
Official site

Museums in Vosges (department)
Music museums in France
Violins